Eskor Toyo (born Asuquo Ita; 1929–2015) was a Nigerian Marxist scholar, writer and academic. Until his death, he was a professor of economics at the University of Calabar.

Biography
Born in 1929 in Oron, Akwa Ibom State, Eskor completed his education in Calabar and Lagos. While in Grade One in 1945, he obtained the Cambridge School Certificate and the Cambridge Higher School Certificate which he passed. After obtaining a Diploma in Public Administration, he proceeded to the University of London where he obtained a BSc in economics. Eskor furthered his education by obtaining a postgraduate diploma in National Economic Planning, an MSc and a PhD in economics.

As an academic, Eskor taught economics in some universities in Europe and Nigeria before he became head of Department of Economics in the Universities of Maiduguri and Calabar.

Eskor was one of the pioneering founders of defunct Nigerian Marxist–Leninist party Socialist Workers and Farmers Party of Nigeria. After suffering from series of strokes, he died on 7 December 2015 at the University of Calabar Teaching Hospital in Calabar.

References

Bibliography

External links
Tribute on The News Nigeria
Tribute on Vanguard Newspaper
Tribute on The Nation Newspaper

1929 births
2015 deaths
Academic staff of the University of Calabar
Academic staff of the University of Maiduguri
Alumni of the University of London
Scholars of Marxism